{{DISPLAYTITLE:C8H6N2}}
The molecular formula C8H6N2 (molar mass: 130.15 g/mol) may refer to:

 Cinnoline
 1,8-Naphthyridine
 Phthalazine, also called benzo-orthodiazine or benzopyridazine
 Quinazoline
 Quinoxaline

Molecular formulas